"Keep Your Head Down, Fritzie Boy" is a World War I song written and composed by Gitz Rice. This song was published in 1918 by Leo. Feist, Inc., in New York, NY. The cover features a photo of Gitz Rice and reads "inspired by a brave Tommy and written at the Battle of Ypres, 1915."

The song was in the top 20 charts from July to October 1918 and reached number 11 in August. It was recorded by both the American Quartet and Arthur Fields.

The sheet music can be found at the Pritzker Military Museum & Library.

References

Bibliography
Parker, Bernard S. World War I Sheet Music 1. Jefferson: McFarland & Company, Inc., 2007. . 
Paas, John Roger. 2014. America Sings of War: American Sheet Music from World War I. . 
Silverman, Jerry. 2002. Of Thee I Sing: Lyrics and Music for America's Most Patriotic Songs. New York, NY: Citadel Press. . 
Rubin, Richard. 2013. The Last of the Doughboys: the Forgotten Generation and Their Forgotten World War. . 
Vogel, Frederick G. World War I Songs: A History and Dictionary of Popular American Patriotic Tunes, with Over 300 Complete Lyrics. Jefferson: McFarland & Company, Inc., 1995. . 

Songs about Germany
Anti-German sentiment
1918 songs
Songs of World War I
Songs written by Gitz Rice